Hemiplatytes epia is a moth in the family Crambidae. It was described by Harrison Gray Dyar Jr. in 1912. It has been recorded from the US state of California.

The length of the forewings is 6.5–9 mm for males and 8.5–10 mm for females. Adults are on wing from June to October.

References

Ancylolomiini
Moths described in 1912
Moths of North America